Claes Nordin, born 20 July 1955 is a male badminton player from Sweden.

Career
Nordin won the gold medal at the 1980 European Badminton Championships in men's doubles with Stefan Karlsson.

Achievements

International tournaments 
Men's doubles

References

Swedish male badminton players
Living people
1955 births